Limacoidea is a taxonomic superfamily of medium-sized to large, air-breathing land slugs and snails. They are terrestrial pulmonate gastropod mollusks in the infraorder Stylommatophora (according to the taxonomy of the Gastropoda by Bouchet & Rocroi, 2005).

The Helixarionoidea were previously placed in this superfamily.

Families
The following four families have been recognized in the taxonomy of Bouchet & Rocroi (2005):
 Limacidae
 Agriolimacidae
 Boettgerillidae
 Vitrinidae

Cladogram 
A cladogram shows the phylogenic relation of this superfamily to other superfamilies in the limacoid clade:

References

Further reading 

Stylommatophora
Gastropod superfamilies